Saint Ursicinus may refer to:

 Saint Ursicinus of Ravenna (d. 67), Italian physician and Roman Catholic martyr, feast 19 June
 Ursicinus of Brescia (d. 347), Italian bishop and saint, feast 1 December
 St. Ursicinus (356–387), bishop of Sens in northern France
 Ursicinus (Bishop of Ravenna), archbishop of Ravenna from 533 to 536
 Ursicinus of Saint-Ursanne (d. 625), Irish missionary to present-day Switzerland, feast 20 December
 St. Ursicinus (d. 760), bishop of Chur in Switzerland